Pirkkola (Finnish), Britas (Swedish) is a northern neighborhood of Helsinki, Finland.

Sports club Helsingin Palloseura has its home ground in Pirkkola.

Neighbourhoods of Helsinki